Kaltensundheim is a village and a former municipality in the district Schmalkalden-Meiningen, in Thuringia, Germany. Since 1 January 2019, it is part of the town Kaltennordheim.

References

Former municipalities in Thuringia
Schmalkalden-Meiningen
Grand Duchy of Saxe-Weimar-Eisenach